Minashvili is a Georgian surname. Notable people with the surname include:

Akaki Minashvili (born 1980), Georgian politician 
Guram Minashvili (1935–2015), Georgian basketball player 
Mamuka Minashvili (born 1971), Georgian football player